Unsubscribe may refer to:

 Unsubscribing from a mailing list, where an individual or an organization sends material to multiple recipients
 Unsubscribing from a subscription business model, where a customer must pay a subscription price to have access to a product or service
 Unsubscribe (film), a 2020 short film